

Willi Moser (2 November 1887 – 18 October 1946) was a German general during World War II who commanded the LXXI Army Corps. He was  a recipient of the Knight's Cross of the Iron Cross of Nazi Germany. Moser was taken prisoner by Soviet troops in 1945 and died in Soviet captivity on 18 October 1946.

Awards and decorations

 Knight's Cross of the Iron Cross on 26 October 1941 as Generalleutnant and commander of 299. Infanterie-Division

References

Citations

Bibliography

 

1887 births
1946 deaths
Military personnel from Wrocław
People from the Province of Silesia
German Army generals of World War II
Generals of Artillery (Wehrmacht)
German Army personnel of World War I
Prussian Army personnel
Recipients of the Gold German Cross
Recipients of the Knight's Cross of the Iron Cross
German prisoners of war in World War II held by the Soviet Union
German people who died in Soviet detention
Reichswehr personnel